

354001–354100 

|-bgcolor=#f2f2f2
| colspan=4 align=center | 
|}

354101–354200 

|-bgcolor=#f2f2f2
| colspan=4 align=center | 
|}

354201–354300 

|-bgcolor=#f2f2f2
| colspan=4 align=center | 
|}

354301–354400 

|-bgcolor=#f2f2f2
| colspan=4 align=center | 
|}

354401–354500 

|-bgcolor=#f2f2f2
| colspan=4 align=center | 
|}

354501–354600 

|-bgcolor=#f2f2f2
| colspan=4 align=center | 
|}

354601–354700 

|-id=659
| 354659 Boileau ||  || Nicolas Boileau-Despreaux (1636–1711), a French poet and critic || 
|}

354701–354800 

|-bgcolor=#f2f2f2
| colspan=4 align=center | 
|}

354801–354900 

|-bgcolor=#f2f2f2
| colspan=4 align=center | 
|}

354901–355000 

|-bgcolor=#f2f2f2
| colspan=4 align=center | 
|}

References 

354001-355000